Hugh Allan (born Allan Abram Hughes; November 5, 1903 - February 12, 1997) was an American actor. He had several lead roles. He was born Allan Abram Hughes in Oakland, California.

Allan married Lou Williamson. He died in Memphis in 1997. He is buried at Memorial Park Cemetery in Memphis.

A reviewer describing The Fire Detective wrote that he makes a personable hero.

His role in Wild Beauty was described as being carried out ably but not with a lot of charisma.

Filmography

References

External links
"Hugh’s Little Sweetheart" from Close-ups and Long-shots

1903 births
1997 deaths
Male actors from Oakland, California
Male actors from Memphis, Tennessee